Roland Robertson (born 1938, died 2022) was a sociologist and theorist of globalization who lectured at the University of Aberdeen in Scotland. Formerly, he was a professor of sociology at the University of Pittsburgh, and in 1988 he was the President of the Association for the Sociology of Religion.

Robertson's theories have focused significantly on a more phenomenological and psycho-social approach than that of more materialist oriented theorists such as Immanuel Wallerstein or Fredric Jameson. For Robertson, the most interesting aspect of the modern (or postmodern) era is the way in which a global consciousness has developed. He lays down a progression of "phases" that capture the central aspects of different eras in global history, asserting that the fifth phase, Global Uncertainty, has been reached.

Robertson's main works are Globalization: Social Theory and Global Culture (1992) and the edited volume Global Modernities. In 1985, he was the first sociologist to use the term globalization in the title of a sociological article. His 1992 definition of globalization as "the compression of the world and the intensification of the consciousness of the world as a whole" has been credited as the first ever definition of globalization, though a more detailed analysis of the history of this term indicates it has many authors. He is also said to have coined the term glocalization in 1992.

Publications

Books
 Roland Robertson (1970 Shocken Books ISBN 9780805233476) The Sociological Interpretation of Religion
 Roland Robertson (1978 New York University Press ISBN 9780814773741) Meaning and Change
 Roland Robertson (1992 Sage Publications Ltd ISBN 9780803981874) Globalization: Social Theory and Global Culture
 Edited by Mike Featherstone, Scott Lash & Roland Robertson, (1995 Sage Publications Ltd ISBN 9780803979482) Global Modernities

References

External links
University of Aberdeen faculty information for Roland Robertson

1938 births
Academics of the University of Aberdeen
British sociologists
University of Pittsburgh faculty